Alemitu Bekele (Alemitu Bekele Degfa; born 17 September 1977) is an Ethiopian-born Turkish long-distance runner, who specialized in the 5000 metres.

Bekele was born in Shoa, Ethiopia. In the 5000 metres she finished seventh at the 2008 Olympic Games. In the 3000 metres she won the gold medal at the 2009 European Indoor Championships, and also competed at the 2008 World Indoor Championships, without reaching the final round.

She set an indoor European record at the beginning of 2010: her time of 14:46.44 at the GE Galan - a result later voided - was enough to beat Gabriela Szabo's 11-year-old mark. Despite this achievement, which made her the fifth fastest of all-time over the distance, she finished some 20 seconds adrift of winner Meseret Defar who narrowly missed the world record. This record was later rescinded due to a doping offense.

She won the 5000 m at the 2010 European Athletics Championships in a championship-record time of 14 minutes, 52.20 seconds  - a result later voided - at Barcelona's Olympic stadium. She represented Team Europe at the 2010 IAAF Continental Cup and claimed the 3000 m silver medal  - a result later voided. She opened her 2011 season at the Cinque Mulini and won the individual title as well as the team title for Üsküdar Belediyespor - results later voided -  as part of the European Cross Country Club Championships.

Doping ban
On 16 January 2013, the IAAF announced that she had been banned from competition for four years until 14 February 2016 due to use or attempted use of illegal drugs, and all her results since August 17, 2009 will be voided. This resulted from irregularities in her biological passport.

Personal bests

NR National record

See also
 Turkish women in sports

References

External links 
 

1977 births
Living people
Ethiopian female long-distance runners
Turkish female long-distance runners
Olympic athletes of Turkey
Athletes (track and field) at the 2008 Summer Olympics
European Athletics Championships medalists
World Athletics Championships athletes for Turkey
Enkaspor athletes
Turkish sportspeople in doping cases
Doping cases in athletics
Ethiopian sportspeople in doping cases
Ethiopian emigrants to Turkey
Turkish people of Ethiopian descent
Naturalized citizens of Turkey
European champions for Turkey